Cessna was an American aircraft manufacturing company.

Cessna is the name of:

People
 Bob Cessna (1934–2008), American actor
 Clyde Cessna (1879–1954), American aircraft designer
 John Cessna (1821–1893), American politician from Pennsylvania

Places
 Cessna, Pennsylvania
 Cessna Township, Hardin County, Ohio

See also
 Cesena
 Cessna Aircraft Field
 Cessna Stadium